Meghan MacLaren (born 15 May 1994) is an English professional golfer that plays on the Ladies European Tour.

MacLaren won eight times as a Florida International University player before graduating with a degree in English and turning professional in 2016. She won the final LET Access Series tournament of 2016, the Santander Golf Tour LETAS La Penaza, and again at the 2017 Azores Ladies Open. In 2017 she won the LET Access Series Order of Merit and gained her full card for the 2018 Ladies European Tour, where she had seven top-10 finishes, including securing her maiden victory at Women's NSW Open. At the 2018 European Golf Team Championships she medalled twice.

The highlights of 2019 included successfully defending her Women's NSW Open title, a runner-up finish in the Jordan Mixed Open, and a third place in Jabra Ladies Open.

Professional wins (7)

Ladies European Tour wins (3)

^Co-sanctioned with the WPGA Tour of Australasia

LET Access Series (2)
2016 Santander Golf Tour LETAS La Peñaza
2017 Azores Ladies Open

Symetra Tour wins (1)
2021 Prasco Charity Championship

Other wins (1)
2020 Rose Ladies Series – Event 2

Team appearances
Amateur
European Girls' Team Championship (representing England): 2012
European Ladies' Team Championship (representing England): 2014, 2015, 2016 (winners)
Patsy Hankins Trophy (representing Europe): 2016
Curtis Cup (representing Great Britain & Ireland): 2016 (winners)
Espirito Santo Trophy (representing England): 2016

Professional
European Championships (representing Great Britain): 2018

References

External links

English female golfers
Ladies European Tour golfers
People from Wellingborough
People from Rushden
1994 births
Living people
20th-century English women
21st-century English women